Torment Saint: The Life of Elliott Smith is a biographical book about the American singer-songwriter Elliott Smith, written by William Todd Schultz. It was released on October 1, 2013, by Bloomsbury.

External links 

 Los Angeles Times review of the book
 The Independent review of the book
 Slate article by Schultz related to the book

Books about Elliott Smith
2013 non-fiction books
Bloomsbury Publishing books